The Florida's Natural Charity Championship Hosted by Nancy Lopez was a golf tournament for professional female golfers that was part of the LPGA Tour from 1992 through 2006. For most of those years it was known as the Chick-fil-A Charity Championship. It was played annually at the Eagle's Landing Country Club in Stockbridge, Georgia.  

The title sponsor from 1995 to 2005 was Chick-fil-A, a fast-food restaurant chain headquartered in Atlanta, Georgia, that specializes in chicken sandwiches. In 2006, Florida's Natural, a cooperative of Florida citrus growers took over title sponsorship.

It was announced in August 2006 that the tournament had been cancelled because of the lack of a sponsor for 2007.

LPGA Hall of Famer Nancy Lopez was associated with the tournament as its official host. She presented the Nancy Lopez Award to the world's best female amateur golfer at a banquet held each year during the tournament week. It is unclear where the Nancy Lopez Award ceremony will now be held.

Tournament names through the years:
1992: SEGA Women's Championship
1993-1994: Atlanta Women's Championship
1995-2005: Chick-fil-A Charity Championship
2006: Florida's Natural Charity Championship Hosted by Nancy Lopez

The last tournament was held from April 17 through April 23, 2006.

Winners

1997 and 2002 tournaments were shortened to 36 holes due to rain.

Tournament record

References

External links
LPGA tournament microsite

Former LPGA Tour events
Golf in Georgia (U.S. state)
Recurring sporting events established in 1992
Stockbridge, Georgia
History of women in Georgia (U.S. state)